is a Japanese manga series written and illustrated by Wataru Nadatani. It was serialized in Shogakukan's shōnen manga magazine Shōnen Sunday S from November 2018 to January 2022.

Publication
Cat + Gamer, written and illustrated by Wataru Nadatani, was serialized in Shogakukan's shōnen manga magazine Shōnen Sunday S from November 24, 2018, to January 25, 2022. Shogakukan has collected its chapters into eight individual tankōbon volumes that were released from May 17, 2019 to April 18, 2022.

In July 2021, Dark Horse Comics announced that they had licensed the manga for English release in North America. The translation is done by Zack Davisson and the first volume was released on March 2, 2022.

Volume list

Reception
In 2022, the series was nominated for a Harvey Award in the Best Manga category.

References

External links
Cat + Gamer official website at Sunday Web Every 

Comedy anime and manga
Comics about cats
Dark Horse Comics titles
Shogakukan manga
Shōnen manga
Slice of life anime and manga